This is a list of events and openings related to amusement parks that occurred in 2020. These various lists are not exhaustive.

Amusement parks

Opening

Switzerland Ticiland - October 10
China Smurfs Theme Park
China Ocean Paradise
China World Fairytale Land
Indonesia Transmart Jambi
Qatar Doha Oasis (Wonder Dome)
Russia Dream Island Moscow – February 29
U.S. DreamWorks Water Park in American Dream Meadowlands – October 1
U.S. Legoland Discovery Centre in American Dream Meadowlands – March 2020
China Suzhou Paradise Forest World
China Ocean Paradise
China Hot Go Dreamworld
China Daqingshan Wildlife Park - January 1
China Visionland Dingcheng - January 18
Indonesia Banyuwangi Park - May 2020

Change of name 
Canada Galaxyland » Galaxyland powered by Hasbro
U.S. White Water Bay (Oklahoma) » Six Flags Hurricane Harbor Oklahoma City
U.S. Magic Waters » Six Flags Hurricane Harbor Rockford
Vietnam Vinpearl Land, Kiên Giang » VinWonders, Kiên Giang
Vietnam Vinpearl Land, Khánh Hòa » VinWonders, Khánh Hòa
Vietnam Vinpearl Land, Quảng Nam » VinWonders, Quảng Nam

Change of ownership
U.S. Indiana Beach – Apex Parks Group » Indiana Beach Holdings, LLC (now known as IB Parks & Entertainment)
England Drayton Manor Theme Park – The Bryan Family » Looping Group

Birthday

 Alton Towers - 40th birthday
 Busch Gardens Williamsburg - 45th birthday
 Cedar Point - 150th anniversary
 Disneyland - 65th birthday
 Europa Park - 45th birthday
 Gardaland - 45th birthday
 Knott's Berry Farm - 100th anniversary
 Mt. Olympus Water & Theme Park - 30th birthday
 PortAventura World - 25th anniversary
 Sesame Place - 40th birthday
 Silver Dollar City - 60th anniversary
 Six Flags New England - 150th birthday
 Universal Studios Florida - 30th birthday
 Walibi Belgium - 45th birthday
 Drayton Manor - 70th birthday

Closed
 Tokyo One Piece Tower – July 31
 Misaki Park – March 31
 Toshimaen – August 31
 Boomers! Houston – February 2020
 Boomers! El Cajon – June 8
 Boomers! San Diego – June 8
 Boomers! Fountain Valley – June 8
 Boomers! Upland – June 8
 M&D's – April 23
 Holy Land Experience – March 14
 Wild River Country

Additions

Roller coasters

New

Relocated

Refurbished

Other attractions

New

 *Announced for 2020, opening delayed for 2021

Refurbished

Closed attractions & roller coasters

Notes

References

Amusement parks by year
Amusement parks